15th Panzergrenadier Division was a mobile division of the German Army in World War II

Combat History

Sicily
In July 1943 a new 15th Panzergrenadier Division, commanded by Generalleutnant Eberhard Rodt, was formed by redesignating the Sicily Division and incorporated remnants of the former 15th Panzer Division, which had been assigned to North Africa but remained in Sicily due to the collapse of the Afrika Korps.

It was not long before it saw action again, this time in Sicily. As the Germans retreated from western Sicily (as a result of the Allied invasion, code-named Operation Husky), they halted and began setting up defences in the vicinity of the town of Troina along Highway 120, perched high on the hilltops. This was to become a linchpin of the Etna Line. In pursuit was the US 1st Infantry Division, nicknamed "The Big Red One", commanded by Major General Terry Allen. A six-day battle ensued from August 1–6, 1943, at the end of which, fearing encirclement, the 15th Panzergrenadier retreated down Highway 120 toward Cesaro and later Messina to be evacuated from the island.

Italy
By August 17, 1943, the 15th Panzergrenadier along with the 29th Infantry, the 1st Parachute and the Hermann Göring Divisions would escape across the Strait of Messina to the mainland and participate in the Italian Campaign. Beginning on September 9, 1943, the Allied invasion of mainland Italy, (code-named Operation Avalanche), at Salerno and along the beaches to the southeast, found the 15th Panzergrenadiers among the principal defenders. On September 11, elements of the British 46th Infantry Division encountered stiff resistance from the 15th Panzergrenadier and  Hermann Göring Divisions around Salerno itself and to the east.

By mid-November 1943, the 15th Panzergrenadier Division had fallen back to help defend the Bernhardt Line in the vicinity of Mignano along Highway 6. On December 7, 1943, two battalions of the 15th Panzergrenadier, commanded by Captain Helmut Meitzel, held strong defensive positions in the town of San Pietro Infine and on the vitally important and strategic Monte Lungo to the southwest. Elements of the 71st Infantry Division, held the German left flank on the heights of Monte Sammucro to the north, while the 29th Panzergrenadier Division held the rear near the town of San Vittore, two miles to the northwest. The 36th Infantry Division, commanded by Major General Fred L. Walker, launched flanking attacks on their right, while the 1st Italian Motorized Group attacked the left up Monte Lungo. The Battle of San Pietro Infine ensued. After ten days of intense attack and counter-attack, the Allies finally succeeded in gaining the high ground on both flanks. With the advantage lost, the 15th Panzergrenadier and its supporting units fell back to defensive positions in the vicinity of San Vittore in the early hours of December 17; they would hold these positions for the next three weeks.

Between January 20 and 22 1944, two battalions of the 15th Panzergrenadiers repulsed an ill-conceived assault by the US 36th Infantry Division, when the Allies were attempting to establish a bridgehead in the vicinity of the town of Sant' Angelo, to launch attacks on the Gustav Line near Monte Cassino.

On May 11, 1944, the Allies launched Operation Diadem which finally resulted in the collapse of the Gustav Line and the capitulation of the German defences along the Winter Line. From May 15–19, the 15th Panzergrenadiers fought a retreating battle through the Aurunci Mountains against the 3rd Algerian Infantry and 4th Moroccan Mountain Divisions of the French Expeditionary Corps, commanded by General Alphonse Juin.

North-west Europe
The 15th Panzergrenadiers fought the rest of the war on the Western Front. It fought in the Battle of the Bulge, where it participated in the Siege of Bastogne and in Operation Blockbuster, serving under the First Parachute Army. It surrendered to the British at war's end.

Order of battle (1944)
 104. Panzergrenadier Regiment (motorized infantry)
 115. Panzergrenadier Regiment (motorized infantry)
 33. Artillery Regiment (motorized)
 115. Panzer Battalion
 33. Panzerjäger Battalion
 115. Panzer Aufklärung Battalion
 33. Pioneer Battalion (motorized)
 315. Heer Flak Battalion (motorized)
 Signal, Supply and Support Units

Commanders

War crimes
The division has been implicated in the Bellona massacre, Campania, carried out between 6 and 7 October 1943, when 54 civilians were executed.

References

 

German panzergrenadier divisions
Military units and formations established in 1943
Military units and formations disestablished in 1945